Lomovka is the name of several rural localities in Russia:
Lomovka, Republic of Bashkortostan, a selo in Lomovsky Selsoviet of Beloretsky District of the Republic of Bashkortostan
Lomovka, Kursk Oblast, a khutor in Baninsky Selsoviet of Fatezhsky District of Kursk Oblast
Lomovka (selo), Arzamassky District, Nizhny Novgorod Oblast, a selo in Lomovsky Selsoviet of Arzamassky District of Nizhny Novgorod Oblast
Lomovka (settlement), Arzamassky District, Nizhny Novgorod Oblast, a settlement in Lomovsky Selsoviet of Arzamassky District of Nizhny Novgorod Oblast
Lomovka, Kulebaksky District, Nizhny Novgorod Oblast, a selo in Teplovsky Selsoviet of Kulebaksky District of Nizhny Novgorod Oblast
Lomovka, Penza Oblast, a selo in Lomovsky Selsoviet of Luninsky District of Penza Oblast
Lomovka, Perm Krai, a settlement under the administrative jurisdiction of the city of krai significance of Lysva, Perm Krai
Lomovka, Samara Oblast, a selo in Pestravsky District of Samara Oblast
Lomovka, Saratov Oblast, a village in Atkarsky District of Saratov Oblast
Lomovka, Tambov Oblast, a selo in Maryevsky Selsoviet of Inzhavinsky District of Tambov Oblast
Lomovka, Republic of Tatarstan, a village in Verkhneuslonsky District of the Republic of Tatarstan
Lomovka, Bogoroditsky District, Tula Oblast, a selo in Lomovsky Rural Okrug of Bogoroditsky District of Tula Oblast
Lomovka, Shchyokinsky District, Tula Oblast, a village in Lazarevskaya Rural Administration of Shchyokinsky District of Tula Oblast
Lomovka, Tver Oblast, a village in Spirovsky District of Tver Oblast